Shah Bahram (also Romanized as Shāh Bahrām) is a village in Kuh Mareh Khami Rural District, in the Central District of Basht County, Kohgiluyeh and Boyer-Ahmad Province, Iran. At the 2006 census, its population was 211, in 49 families.

References 

Populated places in Basht County